Oneilland West (the name of an ancient Gaelic district) is a barony in County Armagh, Northern Ireland. It is also called Clancann (Clann Chana), after the Mac Cana clan. It lies in the north of the county on the south-western shore of Lough Neagh and the border of County Tyrone. Oneilland West is bordered by five other baronies: Armagh to the west; Dungannon Middle to the north-west; Oneilland East to the north-east; Orior Lower to the south-east; and Kinelarty to the south.

History
Oneilland West along with Oneilland East used to form the barony and Plantation of Ulster precinct of Oneilland. When it was split in two, Oneilland West consisted of the barony west of the River Bann, corresponding to the ancient Irish districts of Oneilland and Clancann.

Mount Roe house is located in this barony. The Battle of the Diamond on 21 September 1795, which led to the foundation of the Orange Order, occurred within this barony at The Diamond crossroads.

List of settlements
Below is a list of settlements in Oneilland West:

Towns
Armagh (part in barony of Armagh)
Richhill
Portadown

Villages and population centres
Annaghmore
Charlemont
Loughgall
Scotch Street
The Birches
The Diamond

List of civil parishes
Below is a list of civil parishes in Oneilland West:
Armagh (split with barony of Armagh)
Clonfeacle (also partly in baronies of Armagh, Dungannon Lower (one townland) and Dungannon Middle)
Drumcree
Grange (split with barony of Armagh)
Kildarton (split with barony of Fews Lower)
Killyman (also partly in barony of Dungannon Middle)
Kilmore (split with barony of Orior Lower)
Loughgall (also partly in barony of Armagh)
Mullaghbrack (split with barony of Fews Lower)
Newry (two townlands, rest in baronies of Iveagh Upper, Lower Half, Lordship of Newry and Orior Upper)
Tartaraghan

References